The 2021 Kuchyně Gorenje Prague Open was a professional women's tennis tournament played on outdoor clay courts. It was the eighth edition of the tournament which was part of the 2021 ITF Women's World Tennis Tour. It took place in Prague, Czech Republic between 30 August and 5 September 2021.

Singles main-draw entrants

Seeds

 1 Rankings are as of 23 August 2021.

Other entrants
The following players received wildcards into the singles main draw:
  Sára Bejlek
  Monika Kilnarová
  Linda Nosková
  Darja Viďmanová

The following players received entry from the qualifying draw:
  Alexandra Bozovic
  Tina Cvetkovič
  Anna Gabric
  Lina Glushko
  Mana Kawamura
  Alice Ramé
  Tereza Smitková
  Valeriya Strakhova

Champions

Singles

 Magdalena Fręch def.  Tereza Smitková, 6–2, 6–1

Doubles

  Miriam Kolodziejová /  Jesika Malečková def.  Kanako Morisaki /  Erika Sema, 6–3, 1–6, [10–2]

References

External links
 2021 Kuchyně Gorenje Prague Open at ITFtennis.com
 Official website

2021 ITF Women's World Tennis Tour
2021 in Czech tennis
August 2021 sports events in the Czech Republic
September 2021 sports events in the Czech Republic